John Coward may refer to:
 John Coward (ice hockey)
 Sir John Coward (Royal Navy officer)
 John Coward, airline pilot, see British Airways Flight 38.